Broeren is a surname. Notable people with the surname include:

Gerben Broeren (born 1972), Dutch track cyclist
Wayne Broeren (1933–1991), American Paralympic athlete

See also
Broer
Broers